The 6th Siptan began on 27 September 2010 and concluded on 5 April 2011. Lee Sedol defeated Kang Yootaek 2–1 in the final.

Tournament

References

2011 in go
Go competitions in South Korea